Behind the Planet of the Apes is a 1998 American television documentary directed by Kevin Burns and David Comtois who also co-wrote it with Brian Anthony and produced by Foxstar Productions.

Premise
It focuses on the five films in the original Planet of the Apes series, and is hosted and narrated by Roddy McDowall, who played Cornelius in the 1968 film Planet of the Apes and Escape from the Planet of the Apes and his son Caesar in Conquest of the Planet of the Apes and Battle for the Planet of the Apes. The documentary premiered on AMC to commemorate the thirtieth anniversary of the first 1968 film.

The documentary discusses the ideas and works that led to the production of the films and franchise, including two television series, one live action and one animated for children. The documentary begins with the original novel written by author Pierre Boulle and how it caught the interest of producer Arthur P. Jacobs, who brought it to 20th Century Fox. The development and production of each film is discussed, including casting, costume design, filming locations and behind the scenes footage.

Release
As of the 2001 DVD release of all five of the classic films, the documentary was also included in the DVD box set. The documentary was also included in the 2008, 40 year evolution Blu-ray set, and was again included in the 2011 reissue of the set.

References

External links
 

1998 films
1998 television films
1998 documentary films
Documentary films about films
Planet of the Apes